Mina con Bignè is an album by Italian singer Mina, originally distributed back to back with the album Mina quasi Jannacci in 1977, the year before she gave her final live concerts. As usual, in 1977, she released two albums, one of covers and one of new songs. Mina con Bignè is her album of unreleased tracks and it features a diverse group of composers, writers, and arrangers such as Riccardo Cocciante, Shel Shapiro, Pino Presti and Cristiano Malgioglio.

Track listing

References

Mina (Italian singer) albums
1977 albums
Albums conducted by Pino Presti
Albums arranged by Pino Presti